L'Humeur vagabonde is a 1955 novel by the French writer Antoine Blondin. It tells the story of a man who leaves his wife and children to make it in Paris, but returns home only to mistaken as his wife's lover. It was Blondin's third novel.

Adaptation
The novel was adapted into a 1972 film with the same title. The film was directed by Édouard Luntz and stars Jeanne Moreau, Michel Bouquet, Madeleine Renaud and Eric Penet.

References

External links
 Publicity page 

1955 French novels
French novels adapted into films
French-language novels
Novels by Antoine Blondin